89.9 TheLight (call sign 3TSC) is a Christian community radio station in Melbourne, Australia attracting more than a million listeners per month. It broadcasts on the FM band with the frequency of 89.9, on DAB+ digital radio and streams online via website and mobile app. Studios are located at 333 Mitcham Road, in Mitcham with FM transmitter on Mount Dandenong

History
The station's beginnings can be traced to 1977, when Melbourne Christian Radio was founded. It conducted test broadcasts in 1980, 1981, and 1982 as 3MCR before purchasing air time on commercial station 3DB.

89.9 TheLight is run by Positive Media Inc, which was formerly called Triple Seven Communications and 89.9 LightFM and Light Melbourne Inc. They conducted a three-month temporary broadcast in late 2001 and was informed in December of that year that they were successful for one of the four community licences available from the Australian Broadcasting Authority, now the Australian Communications and Media Authority. 89.9 TheLight began full-time permanent broadcasting on Sunday 1 December 2002.

In January 2017 it was announced that 89.9 TheLight reaches over a million people a month.

Initiatives

LightNews
89.9 TheLight has its own dedicated news service that provides hourly updates throughout the day, and every half an hour during the breakfast (6am-9am) program. Previously, 89.9 TheLight had broadcast the Macquarie National News program every hour.

Nine News simulcast

An exclusive simulcast of Nine News Melbourne at 18:00 with Peter Hitchener, Tony Jones and Livinia Nixon airs at 18:00 every night of the week, except if the Nine Network is covering the cricket or the NRL Grand Final. The newsreader for that night chats with 89.9 TheLight every afternoon, previewing the bulletin at 18:00 hours.

Careline

The 89.9 TheLight Careline is a supportive service for people who would like prayer, an explanation of Christianity, or simply an understanding ear. Callers may also request to be referred to a local church. The Lord Mayor's Charitable Fund assisted with the operating costs of the Careline in 2003, 2004 and 2005. Careline is an independent nationwide service. "'Careline Connections' is a not for profit Company...provided as a Community service to listeners of Christian media across Australia."

DAB+ Digital radio

89.9 TheLight is simulcast on Digital Radio in Melbourne.

TheLight MIX (formerly LightDigital) is an online and DAB+ digital station broadcasting 100% Christian music, and was launched on 1 December 2011

TheLight Christmas (formerly LightChristmas) broadcasts every year from early December through to early January online and on DAB+ digital radio. In 2014, for the first time, TheLight Christmas appeared as a 'pop up' digital radio station.

Presenters

89.9 TheLight on-air team
The presenters of 89.9 TheLight include Lucy Holmes, Kel McWilliam, Cam Want, Jo Chapman, Joy, Euan, Gianna, Luke And Susie Holt, Azzan Schuster, Clayton Bjelan, MJ Want and Allan Martin, as well as the Nine News Melbourne team

Shows
89.9 TheLight has many full-time and some part-time announcers employed at the radio station. 89.9 TheLight promotes Lucy & Kel primarily, with spots on air throughout the day. In 2021, Lucy and Kel were featured on a billboard advertising campaign around Melbourne suburbs.

Music

Christian

89.9 TheLight plays a wide array of music of both Christian and censored secular music, with references to controversial topics deleted via Light Remixes of secular music. Christian music on the station is generally a mixture of pop, modern rock, and gospel. 89.9 TheLight plays up to 40% Christian music not including Christian songs from mainstream artists such as U2.

Mainstream

89.9 TheLight generally play a mix of adult contemporary music. This makes up the other 60% of music they play. This quite often results in the station playing songs from the Billboard 100 Adult Contemporary. They also include music from the Top 40 Australia and United States singles charts. However, they still play a variety of pop and Soft rock songs from the 1990s and early 2000s.

References

External links

TheLight MIX
TheLight Christmas
Christianity Works
Focus on the Family Australia
Careline Connections Website

Christian radio stations in Australia
Community radio stations in Australia
Radio stations in Melbourne
89.9 TheLight